Cunninghamella blakesleeana is a fungus species in the genus Cunninghamella.

Biotechnology use 
Microbiological oxidation of steroids has been studied using Cunninghamella blakesleeana H-334.

Cunninghamella blakesleeana has been used to transform cortexolone to hydrocortisone.

References

External links 

Cunninghamellaceae
Fungi described in 1927